The Attorney-General for Australia is the First Law Officer of the Crown in right of the Commonwealth of Australia, chief law officer of the Commonwealth of Australia and a minister of state. The attorney-general is usually a member of the Federal Cabinet, but need not be. Under the Constitution, they are appointed by the Governor-General on the advice of the Prime Minister, and serve at the Governor-General's pleasure. In practice, the attorney-general is a party politician and their tenure is determined by political factors. By convention, but not constitutional requirement, the attorney-general is a lawyer by training (either a barrister or solicitor).

It is one of only four ministerial positions (along with Prime Minister, Minister for Defence and Treasurer) that has existed since Federation.

The current attorney-general is Mark Dreyfus MP, who was sworn in on 1 June 2022 as part of his cabinet following the 2022 Australian federal election. Dreyfus is assisted in his portfolio by the Assistant Minister for the Republic held by Matt Thistlethwaite.

History
The attorney-general is nearly always a person with legal training, and eleven former attorneys-general have received senior judicial appointments after their ministerial service.

Billy Hughes was the longest-serving attorney-general of Australia, serving for thirteen and a half years over four non-consecutive terms; this included six years during his own prime ministership.

Historically, the attorney-generalship was seen as a stepping stone to higher office – Alfred Deakin, Billy Hughes, and Robert Menzies all became prime minister, while John Latham, H. V. Evatt, and Billy Snedden were leaders of the opposition. Lionel Bowen was deputy prime minister under Bob Hawke in the 1980s. Additionally, four former attorneys-general have won appointment to the High Court – Isaac Isaacs, H. B. Higgins, John Latham, Garfield Barwick, and Lionel Murphy. Isaacs later became governor-general.

Role and functions

Role 
The attorney-general is the minister responsible for legal affairs, national and public security. The attorney-general also serves as a general legal adviser to the Cabinet, and has carriage of legislation dealing with copyright, human rights and a range of other subjects. They are responsible for the Australian Law Reform Commission and the Australian Commission for Law Enforcement Integrity.

Functions 
Functions of the state and federal attorneys-general include the administration of the selection of persons for nomination to judicial posts and the authorizing of prosecutions. In normal circumstances, the prosecutorial powers of the attorney-general are exercised by the Director of Public Prosecutions and staff; however, the attorney-general maintains formal control—including the power to initiate and terminate public prosecutions and take over private prosecutions.

Statutory criminal law provides that prosecutions for certain offences require the individual consent of the attorney-general. This is generally for offences whose illegality is of a somewhat controversial nature or where there is perceived to be a significant risk that prosecutions of a political nature may be embarked upon. The attorney-general also generally has the power to issue certificates legally conclusive of certain facts (e.g., that the revelation of certain matters in court proceedings might constitute a risk to national security); the facts stated in such certificates must be accepted by the courts and cannot legally be disputed by any parties. The attorney-general also has the power to issue a nolle prosequi with respect to a case, which authoritatively determines that the state (in whose name prosecutions are brought) does not wish to prosecute the case, so preventing any person from doing so.

Relationship with the Australian Security Intelligence Organisation 
See: Australian Security Intelligence Organisation

List of attorneys-general
The following individuals have been appointed as attorney-general for Australia:

Notes
 A member of the Protectionist Party, Higgins served in the Labor ministry of Chris Watson, because Labor had no suitably qualified lawyer in Parliament.
 Hughes took silk in 1909, and became a King's Counsel.
 Whitlam served as part of a two-man ministry together with Lance Barnard for fourteen days, until the full ministry was commissioned.
 Prime Minister Paul Keating's original choice for Attorney-General in 1993 had been Michael Lavarch, but Lavarch's re-election was delayed by the death of an opposing candidate for the seat of Dickson; Duncan Kerr held the portfolio in the interim until Lavarch won the resulting supplementary election. Kerr served as Attorney-General for 26 days. There was no Attorney-General for the eight days between Duffy's commission ending on 24 March 1993 and Kerr's commission commencing on 1 April 1993.
 Gallagher served as part of an interim five-person ministry for nine days, until the full ministry was commissioned.

List of assistant ministers for the republic
The position is responsible for the Albanese government's policy of establishing a republic and is the first Commonwealth portfolio for republic policy.

Attorneys-general of the states and territories
The Australian states each have separate attorneys-general, who are state ministers with similar responsibilities to the federal minister with respect to state law. For attorneys-general of the various states and territories of Australia, see:

 Attorney-General of the Australian Capital Territory
 Attorney-General of New South Wales
 Attorney-General of the Northern Territory
 Attorney-General of Queensland
 Attorney-General of South Australia
 Attorney-General of Tasmania
 Attorney-General of Victoria
 Attorney-General of Western Australia

See also

 Attorney general
 Justice ministry

Notes

References

External links

 

 
Attorney-General